John W. Satterwhite served as a member of the 1865–1867 California State Assembly, representing California's 1st State Senate district.

References

Members of the California State Assembly
19th-century American politicians
California state senators
Year of birth missing
Year of death missing